is a Japanese media series and the fourth and final installment of the Eldran series, created by Sunrise. The series was co-created and funded by Dengeki Hobby Magazine.

Plot
A year after the defeat of the Kikaika's boss Kikaijin, Eldran, the spirit of the Earth is guarding the planet peacefully from the evil villain organizations that came from space or another dimension, while giving several groups of kids special mechas which let them protect the Earth for years. It was only a matter of time when this very peaceful day suddenly changed when a very new evil organization known as the Onigashima attacked Earth. The Earth Defense Force, the Ganba Team and the former Harukaze Elementary students, the Saurers quickly rush to the attack and started fighting this new evil organization. However, the Onigashima managed to easily defeat the Eldran Robots with the pilots inside, which results in them turning into a giant golden sword. The golden sword appears from the sky and turn Gokuraku Elementary School into a base for Daiteioh. Tarou Oomomo is a very brash 5th grader of Class 5-3 along with Kakeru and Mai. The three students accepted Eldran's mission. Now with Asuka's cousin, Hiryu, they are able to fight side by side with each other. Now, riding in their battleship, the Gokuracruiser, the Dankettsu Team children from Class 5-3 are ready to help the other Eldran robots with the pilots inside to fight against the Onigashima.

Characters

A fifth grader who is the leader of the Dankettsu Team and pilot of Teioh, Daiteioh and Perfect Daiteioh. Sometimes called "Momotaro" by his classmates, he is a brash young boy who is really obsessed with the Ganba Team. After his encounter with the Onigashima and meeting Eldran, he then pledged to protect the Earth against their threat.

 

The second member of the Dankettsu Team and the pilot of Kuuoh and only female member of the team, Mai is candidly liked by everyone despite that she is a realist. She admires the Earth Defense Team and was once part of the group, 5 years ago.

 

The third member of the Dankettsu Team and the pilot of Rikuoh. He usually has conflicts with Momotaro in some points, but he is sometimes very reliable in some spots. He usually admires the Saurers, and is also good at sports.

 

The fourth member of the Dankettsu Team and the pilot of both the Ryuoh and Dairyuoh. He is a transfer student from another school and also Asuka's cousin. He is very calm, but sometimes did not participate in the team's actions until he acquired his own unit.

Development
During 2001, Sunrise worked with Dengeki Hobby Magazine on creating a new Eldran series for its 10th anniversary celebration by supplying them with the story board and images. Considered as a one-shot series, it was originally adapted into a manga before an OVA is animated. Almost 8 years after the pilot episode was aired, Daiteioh was included in Namco-Bandai and Banpresto's Super Robot Wars NEO. Sunrise and Starchild Records released a high definition remastered version of the original short video of the series with newly recorded voices, bundled in the Eldran Series Blu-ray Box.

References

External links 

Eldran series
Sunrise (company)
Super robot anime and manga
ASCII Media Works manga
Super Robot Wars